Aromobates duranti (common name: Durant's rocket frog) is a species of frog in the family Aromobatidae. It is endemic to Venezuela where it is known from near La Culata in the Cordillera de Mérida.
Its natural habitats are clear, fast-flowing streams in Andean cloud forest and sub-páramo shrubland. The male protects the eggs that are laid on land. After hatching, the male carries the tadpoles on his back to water where they develop further.

Aromobates duranti is threatened by habitat loss caused by livestock farming. The tadpoles are predated by invasive trout.

References

duranti
Amphibians of Venezuela
Endemic fauna of Venezuela
Taxonomy articles created by Polbot
Amphibians described in 1985